The Companies Act 1928 was an Act of the Parliament of the United Kingdom, which regulated UK company law.

Provisions
It introduced the power of the court to make a disqualification order prohibiting a person from being concerned in the management of a company was introduced by section 75. This was subsequently consolidated as section 275 of the Companies Act 1929 and based on the recommendation of the Report of the Company Law Amendment Committee (1925-1926) under the chairmanship of Mr Wilfrid Greene KC (Cmd 2657). Application for an order was to the court having jurisdiction to wind up the company and could be made by the official receiver or the liquidator or any creditor or contributory of the company. Except where there had been a conviction the power was limited to cases where it appeared in the course of a winding up that any business of the company had been carried on with intent to defraud and the maximum period for which a disqualification order could be made was five years. The power to make such an order was discretionary. The grounds upon which a disqualification order could be made were later extended by section 33 of the Companies Act 1947 (subsequently consolidated as section 188 of the Companies Act 1948) following the Report of the Committee on Company Law Amendment (1945) under the chairmanship of Cohen J (Cmd 6659).

See now the Company Directors Disqualification Act 1986.

See also
Companies Act

Notes

United Kingdom company law
United Kingdom Acts of Parliament 1928
1928 in economics